Mushrooms have been cultivated with novel psychedelic substancess through biotransformation, by artificially adding selected psychoactive substances to the growing substrate. The biotransformed alkaloids could be found in the culture medium.

However, not all substances will be incorporated into mycelium. For example, caffeine did not get structurally changed.

Examples

See also
 Mycoremediation

References

Biological sources of psychoactive drugs
Tryptamines
Psychedelic drugs